Nanami Chino (born 20 October 1998) is a Japanese professional footballer who plays as a midfielder for WE League club Albirex Niigata Ladies.

Club career 
Chino made her WE League debut on 20 September 2021.

References 

WE League players
Living people
1998 births
Japanese women's footballers
Women's association football midfielders
Association football people from Niigata Prefecture
Albirex Niigata Ladies players